This is a survey of the postage stamps and postal history of Nigeria.

First stamps

The first stamps for Nigeria were issued on 1 June 1914 following the amalgamation of all of the British colonies in the area (Northern Nigeria Protectorate and Southern Nigeria Protectorate). The first stamps were the standard King George V Empire keytype, which was also previously used for the issues of Northern Nigeria.

Federation and Republic
The first issue of independent Nigeria was issued on 1 October 1960, following with a definitive issued on 1 January 1961. In 1963 Nigeria became a Republic within the British Commonwealth and a new definitive set was issued on 1 November 1965.

Cameroons U.K.T.T.

Between 1960 and 1961 Nigerian definitives of 1953-57 were overprinted "CAMEROONS/U.K.T.T." for use in Southern Cameroons of the British Mandate territory of British Cameroons. This issue was also valid for use in Northern Cameroons until it joined Nigeria. In 1961, Southern Cameroons became part of Cameroon.

Biafra

Between 30 May 1967 and 15 January 1970, the region of Biafra attempted to secede from Nigeria and issued their own postage stamps. Eventually, after a bloody civil war they rejoined Nigeria.

See also 
List of people on stamps of Nigeria
Nigerian Postal Service
Postage stamps and postal history of Lagos
Postage stamps and postal history of the Oil Rivers Protectorate
Postage stamps and postal history of the Niger Coast Protectorate
Postage stamps and postal history of the Niger Territories
Postage stamps and postal history of the Northern Nigeria Protectorate
Postage stamps and postal history of the Southern Nigeria Protectorate
Postage stamps and postal history of Biafra
Revenue stamps of Nigeria

References

Further reading 
Proud, Ted. The Postal History of Nigeria. Heathfield, Sussex: Proud Bailey, 1995.

External links

Nigerian Philatelic Service.

Postal system of Nigeria
Philately of Nigeria
Postal history of Nigeria